Gary Thomson (born 4 November 1963) is an Irish former cyclist. He competed in the individual road race and the team time trial events at the 1984 Summer Olympics.

References

External links
 

1963 births
Living people
Irish male cyclists
Olympic cyclists of Ireland
Cyclists at the 1984 Summer Olympics
Sportspeople from Dublin (city)